The Small Business Innovation Research (or SBIR) program is a U.S. government funding program, coordinated by the Small Business Administration, intended to help certain small businesses conduct research and development (R&D). Funding takes the form of contracts or grants. The recipient projects must have the potential for commercialization and must meet specific U.S. government R&D needs.

Funds are obtained by allocating a certain percentage of the total extramural (R&D) budgets of the 11 federal agencies with extramural research budgets in excess of $100 million.  Approximately $2.5 billion is awarded through this program each year. The United States Department of Defense (DoD) is the largest agency in this program with approximately $1 billion in SBIR grants annually. Over half the awards from the DoD are to firms with fewer than 25 people and a third to firms of fewer than 10. A fifth are minority or women-owned businesses. Historically a quarter of the companies receiving grants are receiving them for the first time.

In April 2021, the DoD reported on a lack of due diligence for SBIR recipients, which permitted funds to go toward companies linked to the People's Liberation Army. In 2022, the program was reauthorized with additional disclosure requirements for companies that have ties to "any foreign country of concern, including the People’s Republic of China.”

Participating agencies 
Each Federal agency with an extramural budget for R&D in excess of $100,000,000 must participate in the SBIR Program and reserve at least 3.2% of such budget in fiscal year 2017 and each fiscal year after.  A Federal agency may exceed these minimum percentages.  In 2010, the SBIR program across 11 federal agencies provided over $2 Billion in grants and contracts to small U.S. businesses for research in innovation leading to commercialization.

, SBIR programs are in place at the following agencies:
 Department of Agriculture (National Institute of Food and Agriculture)
 Department of Commerce
 National Institute of Standards and Technology
 National Oceanic and Atmospheric Administration
 Department of Defense (divided into 13 components)
 Department of the Army
 Department of the Navy
 Department of the Air Force
Chemical and Biological Defense
Defense Advanced Research Projects Agency
Defense Health Agency
Defense Logistics Agency
Defense Microelectronics Activity
Defense Threat Reduction Agency
Missile Defense Agency
National Geospatial-Intelligence Agency
Office of the Secretary of Defense 
Special Operations Command
 Department of Education (Institute of Education Sciences)
 Department of Energy
 Department of Health and Human Services (National Institutes of Health, Centers for Disease Control and Prevention, Food and Drug Administration) 
 Department of Homeland Security (Science and Technology Directorate, Domestic Nuclear Detection Office)
 Department of Transportation
 Environmental Protection Agency
 National Aeronautics and Space Administration
 National Science Foundation

Related programs
A similar program, the Small Business Technology Transfer Program (STTR), uses a similar approach to the SBIR program to expand public/private sector partnerships between small businesses and nonprofit U.S. research institutions. The main difference between the SBIR and STTR programs is that the STTR program requires the company to have a partnering research institution which must be awarded a minimum of 30% of the total grant funds. As of 2014 federal agencies with external R&D budgets over $1 billion were required to fund STTR programs using an annual set-aside of 0.40%.

The Small Business Technology Council, a member council of the National Small Business Association, hands out the Tibbetts Award annually "to small firms, projects, organizations and individuals judged to exemplify the very best in SBIR achievement."

Federal and State (FAST) is a program of State-based business mentoring and assistance to aid small businesses in the preparation of SBIR proposals and management of the contracts.

History
The program was established with the  enactment into law of the Small Business Innovation Development Act in 1982 to award federal research grants to small businesses. The SBIR program has four original objectives: to stimulate technological innovation;  to use small business to meet Federal research and development needs;  to foster and encourage  participation by minority and disadvantaged persons in technological innovation; and to increase private sector  commercialization innovations derived from Federal research and development.

The program must be periodically reauthorized by the United States Congress, but reauthorization is generally included in each new budget. The program was re-authorized through FY2017 by the 2012 Defense Authorization Act (P.L.112-81).

Rep. Mazie K. Hirono (D-HI) has proposed the SBIR Enhancement Act of 2011 as HR 447 of the 112th Congress, which increases the funding for SBIR by increasing the funding tax from the original 2.5% up to 5%, raises the Phase 1 amount to $200,000 and provides for economic adjustments every five years.

Historical minimum percentages of their "extramural" R&D budgets for awards to small business concerns are:

 2.5% of such budget in each of fiscal years 1997 through 2011;
 2.6% of such budget in fiscal year 2012;
 2.7% of such budget in fiscal year 2013;
 2.8% of such budget in fiscal year 2014;
 2.9% of such budget in fiscal year 2015;
 3.0% of such budget in fiscal year 2016; and
 3.2% of such budget in fiscal year 2017 and each fiscal year after.

A Federal agency may exceed these minimum percentages.

See also
 Stevenson-Wydler Technology Innovation Act of 1980
 Bayh–Dole Act

References

External links
 

Small Business Administration
Research and development in the United States
Fundraising